Rolf Gehring (born 25 November 1955) is a former professional tennis player from Germany. He achieved a career-high singles ranking of world No. 30 in November 1981.

Gehring participated in six Davis Cup ties for West Germany from 1979 to 1982, posting a 4–7 record in singles and a 1–2 record in doubles.

Career singles finals

Titles (2)

Runner-ups (3)

External links
 
 
 

1955 births
Living people
Sportspeople from Düsseldorf
West German male tennis players
Tennis people from North Rhine-Westphalia